Malalhue is a town in the commune of Lanco located northwest of Panguipulli, Chile. The main economic activity of the zone is the manufacturing of oriented strand boards at Louisiana-Pacific's a manufacturing plant near the town. The town lies along the 203-CH route that connects Panguipulli with Lanco at the Chile Highway 5.

See also
 List of towns in Chile

Hot springs of Chile
Populated places in Valdivia Province